Adenosine kinase is an enzyme that in humans is encoded by the ADK gene.

Function 

This gene encodes adenosine kinase, an abundant enzyme in mammalian tissues. The enzyme catalyzes the transfer of the gamma-phosphate from ATP to adenosine, thereby serving as a regulator of concentrations of both extracellular adenosine and intracellular adenine nucleotides. Adenosine has widespread effects on the cardiovascular, nervous, respiratory, and immune systems and inhibitors of the enzyme could play an important pharmacological role in increasing intravascular adenosine concentrations and acting as anti-inflammatory agents. Alternative splicing results in two transcript variants encoding different isoforms. Both isoforms of the enzyme phosphorylate adenosine with identical kinetics and both require Mg2+ for activity.

References

External links

Further reading

EC 2.7.1